Pork rind is the culinary term for the skin of a pig. It can be used in many different ways.

It can be rendered, fried in fat, baked, or roasted to produce a kind of pork cracklings (US) or scratchings (UK); these are served in small pieces as a snack or side dish. The frying renders much of the fat, making it much smaller.

Snack 

Often a byproduct of the rendering of lard, it is also a way of making even the tough skin of a pig edible. In many ancient cultures, animal fats were the only way of obtaining oil for cooking and they were common in many people's diets until the industrial revolution made vegetable oils more common and more affordable.

Microwaveable pork rinds are sold in bags that resemble microwaveable popcorn and can be eaten still warm. Pickled pork rinds, though, are often enjoyed refrigerated and cold. Unlike the crisp and fluffy texture of fried pork rinds, pickled pork rinds are very rich and buttery, much like foie gras.

Preparation 

For the large-scale production of commercial pork rinds, frozen, dried pork skin pellets are used. Cooking makes the rinds expand five times their original size and float on the oil surface. The rinds are then removed from the fat, flavored, and air-dried. Antioxidants may be added to improve stability.

Nutritional value 

Like many snack foods, pork rinds can be high in sodium and fat; however, they are low in carbohydrates and are sometimes considered an alternative snack food for those following a low-carbohydrate diet. According to Men's Health, a  serving contains nine times the protein and less fat than is found in a serving of potato chips, which are much higher in carbohydrates. They add that 43% of pork rind's fat is unsaturated, and most of that is oleic acid, the same healthy fat found in olive oil. Another 13% of its fat content is stearic acid, a type of saturated fat that is considered harmless because it does not raise cholesterol levels. Pork rinds are considered an incomplete source of protein because they contain very low amounts of some essential amino acids, including methionine, tryptophan, and histidine.

Regional variations

Americas

Brazil 
 is a popular snack in Brazil, usually served in bite-sized chunks. It is also a common accompaniment to typical dishes such as feijoada and virado.

Colombia 
 is the term for pork rinds in Colombia. This makes for a crispy skin and a soft, juicy meat. It is traditionally served with beans, rice, fried eggs, Chorizo, ground meat, avocado, and ripe plantain and arepa in a typical plate called .

Canada 
Scrunchions is a Newfoundland term for small pieces of pork rind or pork fatback fried until rendered and crispy. They are often used as a flavoring over other foods, such as salt fish and potatoes, and mainly used as a condiment for fish and brewis.

In Quebec, they are often called  (Christ's ears) and are eaten almost exclusively as part of traditional  meals.

Costa Rica 

 
Preparation could change from using pig fat as base, boiling and later frying, but many prefer using a wok-like pot and wood-fire cooking.

Mexico 

It is commonly served in homes across Mexico. It is often served as an appetizer, or even offered as a snack at family reunions. However,  can be purchased on the street and are usually eaten with hot sauce and lime juice.

If the liquid is drained, the pork rind can be used in tacos, either as fast food products or kitchen-made.

The process requires uniformly cooking rinds, and while the product dehydrates, it cracks, losing small pieces, which are collected afterwards and become a thick, fatty salsa, that can be mixed as an ingredient in other  recipes or used for its flavor and fat in pan frying. The second byproduct in frying rinds is lard.

These are similar to traditional , only made with fried flour leavened with baking soda, instead of fried pig skin. This variety also features a pinwheel shape. Like , this food is popular with street vendors. They are infrequently sold in Mexico, but tend to be a Mexican-American version of the popular .

United States 

Pork rinds is the North American name for fried or roasted skins of pigs. Pieces of fried meat, skin, or membrane produced as a byproduct of rendering lard are also called cracklings. Cracklings consist of either roasted or fried pork rind that has had salt rubbed into it and scored with a sharp knife: "a crackling offers a square of skin that cracks when you bite into it, giving way to a little pocket of hot fat and a salty layer of pork meat."

Cajun cracklings (or "cracklins") from Cajun cuisine (called  in Louisiana French), are fried pieces of pork fat with a small amount of attached skin, flavored after frying with a mixture of peppery Cajun spices.

Pork rinds normally refers to a snack food commercially sold in plastic bags. They are made in a two-step process: pork skin is first rendered and dried, and then fried and puffed. These are also called by the Spanish name, a term from Latin America.

Pork rinds sold in the United States are occasionally stained with a pink or purple spot. These edible marks are actually USDA stamps used on the skins to mark that they have been inspected. They are not harmful.

In 2003, sales of pork rinds experienced rapid growth, but they have dropped "by $31 million since 2004, when they reached $134 million, and now make up barely more than 1% of the salty snack market."

Pork Rinds were a favorite snack of President George H.W. Bush.  In an interview in 1988, he admitted to liking pork rinds in much the same way that Ronald Reagan was known to enjoy jelly beans.  His statement that he liked pork rinds caused an immediate sales spike and manufacturer Rudolph Foods Company had to have its employees work overtime to keep up with the demand.

Asia

China
Zhīzhā is made from pork and are extremely popular in and only popularized in Qingdao, Shandong. It is a byproduct of lard. Lard is usually sold around US$1, but zhīzhā may be sold for about $30–40 and huāzhī for around $10.
 Jīngròu zhīzhā – The skin is removed and sliced as thin as a gold coin. After the extraction of lard, the rest is hard and tastes like a salty cracker, seasoned with salt and MSG while it is hot.
 Huāzhī – This is made from intestines, chopped and deep-fried twice, and used in stew or soup.

Philippines 
It is also available in grocery stores, supermarkets, outdoor markets, sidewalk food vendors, and  stores (small, home made stores).  is prepared by deep-frying dried pork rinds and seasoning with salt. "flower ", from its distinctive shape) made of pig intestine, are also popular.

Thailand 

Khæbh̄mū, or khaep mu, ((), as crispy pork rinds are known in Thai cuisine, are a speciality of the northern Thai city of Chiang Mai. One way of making khaep mu is to first cure the pork skin, with an attached layer of fat, in salt for several days, after which it is soaked in water for a couple of hours. This ensures that the fat cells will expand, resulting in a "puffed skin" after cooking. The slabs of belly fat are then slowly cooked at low heat in, preferably, lard but other animal fat and vegetable oil can also be used. Similar to a confit, the pork thus treated can be stored. The pork is then cut into smaller pieces and baked in an oven until perfectly crispy. Another method of making the pork rinds again involves salting the pork skin, but instead of soaking it, the skin is hung out to dry in the sun after which it is sliced and deep-fried twice. Yet another way to make this dish in Thailand is to first cut the pork skin into strips, then boil them in water after which they are thoroughly dried before being deep-fried.

Northern Thai people most often eat pork rinds together with different Thai chili pastes, such as nam phrik num (made with grilled green chili peppers) and nam phrik ong (made with dried chili peppers, tomato and minced pork). It can also be eaten as a snack, either on its own, or with nam chim khaep mu, a dipping sauce made with lime juice, fresh chili peppers and a sweet chili paste. It can also figure as an accompaniment to Thai dishes such as Nam ngiao and the famous Thai salad som tam or used crushed as an ingredient, for instance in sa makhuea, a northern Thai salad made with minced pork and Thai eggplant.

Vietnam 
Pork rinds used to be a very common food in Vietnam before the Doi moi program in 1986. Due to various economic difficulties in the pre–Doi moi era, cooking oil and meat were still considered "luxury goods", and consequently fat liquid and pork rind became excellent replacements in Vietnamese daily meals. In Vietnamese, pork rind is called  (lit. "dried piece of fat").

Europe 

Often they are mixed with lard as a type of spread, and served with bread. They are particularly popular in this form during celebrations when alcohol is to be consumed.

In Lithuania and Latvia they are mixed with boiled peas and served as a snack. "peas with cracklings"). They are also usually served with Lithuanian .

They are part of the traditional Czech dish , or potato dumplings with cracklings and sauerkraut. See the picture.

In Hungary, cracklings –  – may be made from pork or goose skin. They are usually served with salt and bread, sometimes vegetables. Their consumption is at its peak during the season of pig slaughter, as it is then when pork rind is at its freshest. It is usually consumed as a breakfast or dinner food. A kind of biscuit, is made with crackings.

The outer layer of a pig's skin.

In Spain they are called . It was brought to South America where they got very famous. They are sold by weight in salumerias in Catalonia, and in the Carnival time they are often also found in pastries. Some  use them to make egg , since in Barcelona both products are strongly associated to Fat Thursday.

In Portugal they are called  (same as in Brazil). They are a common addition to other cooked dishes, for the added flavor and fat content, or also enjoyed as a snack. Also used to make  ("pork rind cake"), which is a traditional bread baked with bits of  inside it. 

In Denmark and Sweden Flæskesvær/Fläsksvål is a traditional snack served cold and dried (cf. flæskesteg).

United Kingdom 

Pork scratchings is the British name for deep-fried, salted, crunchy pork rind with fat produced separately from the meat, eaten cold. Pork scratchings typically are heavy and hard, have a crispy layer of fat under the skin, and are flavoured only with salt. The pig hair is usually removed by quickly burning the skin of the pig before it is cut into pieces and cooked in hot fat. In comparison, Crackling is distinguished from normal pork rind in the United Kingdom by the fact that it is cut from a freshly roasted joint of pork (usually Pork loin or Belly pork), or the outside of a Pork chop, after the meat has finished cooking and is usually served warm or hot, before the fat on the underside of the roasted skin can finish cooling down and re-solidifying. Larger joints of pork from the leg or shoulder when roasted in the oven can produce an unevenly crackled rind due to the curvature of the joint: this can be rectified by removing the rind after the joint is cooked and resting, and laying it flat on a baking tray or directly on the oven shelf bars and further cooking at a high oven temperature or by using the grill setting.

Pork scratchings are sold as a snack food in a variety of common brands. Unlike the physically large, but relatively light bags of deep-fried skin without the fat sold around the world, in the UK they are sold in relatively small bags which usually weigh between 42 g and 90 g. and are eaten as an accompaniment to a pint of beer in a pub, just like crisps or peanuts. Scratchings can also be bought from butchers, supermarkets or newsagents. They have been taken to both the North and South Poles on various expeditions, because of their high energy content.

There are three distinct types. Traditional scratchings are made from shank rind and cooked just once. Pork crackling is also made from shoulder rind but is fried twice. It is first rendered at a low heat, and then cooked at a higher temperature for a less fatty, crispier result, or cut from roasted pork joints to produce heavier but less fatty results. A more recent development is the pork crunch, which is made from the back rind and again double-fried to become a large, puffy snack. Some supermarkets now sell just the layer of skin and fat (no meat), in a raw form for home grilling or roasting, or cooked and ready to eat from hot food counters. The term "crackling" is also often applied to a twice-cooked variety of pork scratchings.

See also 

 Chicharron
 Ciccioli, an Italian food made from pressed pork scraps
 Čvarci
 Gribenes, a Jewish snack made from chicken skin
 Krupuk kulit, a similar Indonesian snack but more commonly made from cattle skin.

References 

Condiments
Cuts of pork
Skin
World cuisine
American snack foods
Breakfast

it:Ciccioli